The 2021–22 East of Scotland Football League (known as the Central Taxis East of Scotland League for sponsorship reasons) was the 93rd season of the East of Scotland Football League, and the 8th season as the sixth tier of the Scottish football pyramid system. The season began on 16 July 2021.

Teams
The following teams changed division after the 2020–21 season.

To East of Scotland Football League
Transferred from East Premiership South
 Armadale Thistle
 Bathgate Thistle
 Bo'ness Athletic
 Fauldhouse United
 Livingston United
 Pumpherston
 Stoneyburn
 Syngenta
 West Calder United
 Whitburn

Edinburgh College also joined.

From East of Scotland Football League
Withdrawn
 Eyemouth United

Premier Division

The Premier Division remained with the same 18 clubs as before, after the 2020–21 season was declared null and void. This was to be reduced to 16 clubs for the 2022–23 season, with at least 4 clubs being relegated depending on promotion and relegation with the Lowland League.

The league title went down to the final round of matches with Tranent Juniors ultimately winning the league on goal difference ahead of Penicuik Athletic.

Stadia and locations

Notes

All grounds equipped with floodlights, except Humbug Park (Crossgates Primrose).

League table

Results

First Division
The First Division conferences remain the same as the 2020–21 season, with the exception of Edinburgh South moving from A to B in order to balance the conferences after Eyemouth's withdrawal. Clubs that finish second to seventh in each conference will form part of a First Division of 16 clubs and the remaining clubs will make up the Second Division in 2022–23.

Conference A

Stadia and locations

League table

Results

Conference B

Stadia and locations

Notes

League table

Results

Conference X

Two clubs were promoted to the Second Division for 2022–23.

Stadia and locations

Notes

League table

Results

Notes
 Club with an SFA Licence eligible to participate in the Lowland League promotion play-off should they win the Premier Division.

References

External links

East of Scotland Football League
6
SCO